Non-profit journalism (abbreviated as NPJ, also known as a not-for-profit journalism or think tank journalism) is the practice of journalism as a non-profit organization instead of a for-profit business. NPJ groups are able to operate and serve the public good without the concern of debt, dividends and the need to make a profit. Just like all non-profit organizations, NPJ outfits depends on private donations and or foundation grants to pay for operational expenses.

Non-profit journalism history

The recent emergence of non-profit journalism may lead some to believe that this is a new trend in a struggling industry. However, journalism non-profits have been operating since the beginning of the newspaper age. In 1846, five New York newspapers united to share incoming reports from the Mexican–American War. That experiment in journalism became the Associated Press, which to this day is still a non-profit cooperative.

New Internationalist magazine – published since 1973 in the UK and since 1979 as a separate company in Australia – represents one of the world's longest-lasting independent non-profit publications. In the United States, two local non-profit journalism organizations, The Chicago Reporter and City Limits Magazine, were established in 1974 and 1976, respectively to cover social and economic urban policy issues. The Center for Investigative Reporting (founded in 1977) is the nation's oldest non-profit investigative news organization. The second oldest is the Center for Public Integrity (CPI), founded in 1989 by Charles Lewis, a former producer for ABC News and CBS News. CPI's international arm, the International Consortium of Investigative Journalists (ICIJ), was founded in 1997. ICIJ works through a global network of 175 investigative reporters in more than 60 countries.

In 2013, a Pew Research Center study found that there were 172 nonprofit news outlets based in the United States founded between 1987 and April 2012. The study included in its count only those outlets that were active; primarily published online; and produced original reporting (i.e., non news aggregation or only opinion content).

The study found that:

The study found that about "two-thirds of the 172 nonprofit news outlets studied are sponsored or published by another organization; just one third are independent." Sponsors were most often a nonprofit think tank, another news organization, or a university. Most non-profit news outlets were small, with 78% reporting five or fewer full-time paid staffers.

Examples
 Center for Investigative Reporting (The Bay Citizen merged with CIR in 2012)
 InsideClimate News
 The Marshall Project
 Mother Jones
 ProPublica
 The Texas Tribune
 Global Reporting Centre
 Center for Public Integrity
 The Trace
 The Guardian
 Common Dreams

See also

 Citizen journalism
 Creative nonfiction
 History of journalism
 History of American newspapers
 Journalism genres
 Philanthrojournalism

References

Types of journalism
Investigative journalism
Profit